Japan Air Lines Flight 472 was a flight from London to Tokyo via Frankfurt, Rome, Beirut, Tehran, Bombay, Bangkok and Hong Kong. On September 24, 1972, the flight landed at Juhu Aerodrome near Bombay, India instead of the city's much larger Santacruz Airport (now Chhatrapati Shivaji International Airport) and overran the runway, resulting in the aircraft being written off after being damaged beyond economic repair.

Aircraft
The aircraft involved was a Douglas DC-8-53, registration JA8013. The aircraft was c/n 45681. It had first flown in 1964.

Accident
The flight departed London 20 minutes late. By the time it left Tehran for Bombay, it was 80 minutes behind schedule. The crew planned to execute an ILS approach to Santacruz Airport, Bombay. However, the air traffic controller (ATC) asked the crew, "Can you see the runway?", to which they replied, "Yes, we can". Since the weather was good around the airport that day, the ATC instructed, "VFR approach please".

After this, Flight 472 flew past Runway 09 on the west side of Santacruz Airport while descending, and executed a 360-degree turn in order to approach again from the west and land. However, when it did land at 06:50 local time (01:20 UTC), it was in fact landing on Runway 08 of Juhu Aerodrome.

After deploying the thrust reversers, the captain realized the mistake and immediately deployed spoilers and applied maximum braking power, but an overrun was inevitable. The DC-8 overshot the runway, breaking off both engines on the port wing, and damaging the front and main landing gear, causing the nose of the aircraft to dive into the ground. The wreckage caught fire, but the fire was soon put out by fire extinguishers.

At the time of the accident, there were 14 crew and 108 passengers on board. The aircraft was damaged beyond economic repair. 2 cockpit crew and 9 passengers (all non-Japanese) were reported injured. It was the second Japan Airlines accident in India, coming just two months after the fatal crash of Japan Air Lines Flight 471 in Delhi.

Cause
The accident itself was nothing more than pilot error. However, the Indian authorities were also blamed for operating an airport for small aircraft so close to Santacruz, causing confusion (see similar incidents below), even though the Juhu Aerodrome  had been built before India's independence, in the colonial era. Another factor was that during the 360-degree turn Flight 472 faced the sun and morning mist, and the cockpit crew lost sight of the runway. When they suddenly saw the runway of Juhu Aerodrome, they mistook it for the runway of Santacruz, and landed on it.

Similar accidents and incidents
There have been many instances of aircraft being landed at airports other than the intended destination. In the majority of cases the aircraft was not damaged and returned to service.

On July 15, 1953, a BOAC DH.106 Comet also landed at Juhu Aerodrome instead of Santacruz Airport. The aircraft was flown out some nine days later.

On 28 May 1968, the pilot of a Garuda Indonesia Convair 990 had also mistaken the same Juhu Aerodrome for Santacruz Airport and tried to land his aircraft. It overshot the runway falling just short of the traffic road ahead and several residential buildings when its nose wheel got stuck in a ditch at the end of the runway. All passengers survived.

Only four months after the Japan Air Lines Flight 472 incident, another similar incident happened when an Ilyushin Il-18 (turboprop airliner) of Interflug, an airline of the German Democratic Republic (East Germany), landed at the wrong airport and stopped immediately in front of a parked Japan Air Lines aircraft, narrowly escaping a collision.

In 2006 alone, there were three events of civilian airliners landing at Poznań-Krzesiny military airbase in Poland: a British Beech 400A Beechjet (N709EL) on July 17, Turkish Boeing 737-400 (TC-SKG) on August 16 and Cessna 560 (DCASA) on October 3. Of these incidents, the one involving Turkish Boeing was the most severe, as the air base was closed for operations at the time, meaning that the runway lights and other means of support for landing aircraft were switched off. In all cases, the proximity and similarity of Krzesiny air base to civilian Poznań-Ławica Airport were cited as the reason for mistake: Ławica and Krzesiny lie 14 km apart, and both runways are placed at similar angle.

The most recent accident involving an aircraft landing at the wrong airport was the 2019 Saha Airlines Boeing 707 crash when a Saha Airlines Boeing 707 crashed after accidentally landing at Fath Air Base, which had a shorter runway. This accident resulted in fatalities, with 15 of the 16 occupants onboard perishing.

References

Aviation accidents and incidents in 1972
Accidents and incidents involving the Douglas DC-8
472
Airliner accidents and incidents caused by pilot error
Aviation accidents and incidents in India
1972 in India
1972 in Japan
September 1972 events in Asia